Odostomia kuiperi is a species of sea snail, a marine gastropod mollusc in the family Pyramidellidae, the pyrams and their allies.

Description
The shell size varies between 1.4 mm and 1.8 mm.

Distribution
This species occurs in the following locations:
 Azores Exclusive Economic Zone
 European waters (ERMS scope)

References

 Van Aartsen, J.J.; Gittenberger, E.; Goud, J. (1998). Pyramidellidae (Mollusca, Gastropoda, Heterobranchia) collected during the Dutch CANCAP and MAURITANIA expeditions in the south-eastern part of the North Atlantic Ocean (part 1) Zool. Verh. 321: 3-57

External links
 
 To CLEMAM
 To Encyclopedia of Life
 To World Register of Marine Species

kuiperi
Gastropods described in 1998
Molluscs of the Atlantic Ocean